Diacyclops is a genus of cyclopoid copepods in the family Cyclopidae. There are more than 120 described species in Diacyclops.

See also
 List of Diacyclops species

References

External links

 

Cyclopidae
Articles created by Qbugbot